"Saturns Pattern" is a song released by Paul Weller as a single on May 11, 2015. It was first broadcast on the Chris Evans Breakfast Show on BBC Radio 2. It was released on 7" and 12" vinyl formats and digitally. It was the first single to be taken from Weller's 12th studio album, Saturns Pattern, of which it is the title track.

Its B-side is the non-album track "Sun Goes".

Weekly charts
The single reached number 2 on the UK Vinyl Singles Chart on 17 May 2015.

References

2015 singles
2015 songs
Songs written by Paul Weller
Parlophone singles